Sigrid Huun (born July 25, 1952) is a Norwegian actress. She made her film debut in Himmel og helvete in 1969. Among her television performances, she is remembered for having performed in the comedy series Egentlig on NRK in the 1990s. She also works as a psychologist.

Filmography

 1969: Himmel og helvete as Eva Falck
 1979: Kjærleikens ferjereiser as Marianne Kretsen
 1979: Lucie as Henny
 1980: Nedtur as Elin
 1981: Martin as the charmer's girl
 1981: Sølvmunn as Tove
 1986: Mama Tumaini
 1986: X
 1987: Is-slottet as the mother
 1990: Gränslots as Torunn
 1999: Suffløsen as Helen
 2008: Ulvenatten as Silje Gran
 2021: HAN'' as Eirik's mother

References

External links
 
 Sigrid Huun at Sceneweb
 Sigrid Huun at Filmfront

1952 births
Living people
20th-century Norwegian actresses
21st-century Norwegian actresses
Norwegian women psychologists